Stromerosuchus (meaning "Ernst Stromer's crocodile") is a dubious genus of Late Cretaceous crocodyliform. Fragmentary remains have been found from the Cenomanian-age Bahariya Formation of Egypt. The genus was named in 1936 by Oskar Kuhn. It is named in honor of Ernst Stromer, the German paleontologist who found the fossils in the Bahariya Oasis in 1911 and described them in 1922. After their discovery, the fossils, along with many others found from Bahariya, were in the possession of the Egyptian Geological Survey. In 1922, the fossils were sent back to Stromer (who was in Germany at the time), but they were badly crushed in shipment from Egypt. Because the known remains are so poor, the genus is now regarded as a nomen dubium. Some material has been referred to the genera Aegyptosuchus and Stomatosuchus, both named by Stromer from the Bahariya material.

References

Late Cretaceous crocodylomorphs of Africa
Bahariya Formation
Fossil taxa described in 1936
Cenomanian genera